Scopula oppilata is a moth of the family Geometridae. It is found in Australia (Queensland) and New Guinea.

References

Moths described in 1861
oppilata
Moths of Australia
Moths of New Guinea